Instytut Rozbitek is a center near Poznań, Poland meant for development of new work in the areas of film, theatre, music and new media. The institute was founded by the Oscar - Winning Polish composer Jan A.P. Kaczmarek in 2004. The Institute consists of the 19th-century castle and surrounding buildings, which are currently under renovation.

It is a place of workshops. In 2011 and 2012 it was one of the locations of the Master Classes workshops, during the Transatlantyk - Poznan International Film and Music Festival.

References

External links
Instytut Rozbitek - official website
Transatlantyk Poznań International Film and Music Festival - official website

Polish culture